Derek Landy (born 23 October 1974) is an Irish author and screenwriter, best known for the Skulduggery Pleasant book series.

Career
Landy has written two screenplays that have been made into films, the IFTA award-winning Dead Bodies and the IFTA-nominated Boy Eats Girl starring Samantha Mumba. Landy himself was nominated for an IFTA for Best Script.

Frustrated with the collaborative process of filmmaking, Landy moved on to writing the Skulduggery Pleasant series, starting with the novel of the same name. The novel was published by Harper Collins, who paid £1.8 million for the publishing rights. There are 15 books in the series with 3 spin offs.
In 2007, he signed a deal with Warner Bros. worth an estimated US$1 million for the rights to adapt his Skulduggery Pleasant series, which he intended to adapt himself. However, his script was constantly rewritten and Landy, unhappy with the results, bought back the rights. He sold the rights to another company which couldn't make it, then worked with another company that "petered out". As of 2020, he was working on an adaptation with an undisclosed film making company.

Landy is a fan of Joss Whedon's works, notably Buffy the Vampire Slayer, as well as Philip Pullman's His Dark Materials series. He is also a fan of Gilmore Girls and Doctor Who.

Landy wrote a short story based on the Tenth Doctor from Doctor Who as part of a short story collection celebrating the show's 50th anniversary. The story was published by Puffin in 2013, titled "The Mystery of the Haunted Cottage". He was supposed to write an episode for the second series of the Doctor Who spinoff Class, but the show was cancelled.

Personal life
Landy attended Drogheda Grammar School (this is a private boarding/day school, in Ireland) during his childhood years, and later studied animation at Ballyfermot College. He also has a black belt in kenpo karate. Prior to his contract with HarperCollins, he worked on his parents' vegetable farm. He has been dating Laura Jordan, who is also a writer, from Sittingbourne for a number of years and they now live together in Ireland.

Reception
In a review of his first book, Skulduggery Pleasant, Sarah Webb of the Irish Independent wrote that it "is taut, full of zippy dialogue and fantastically visuals".

Awards
In 2008, Landy won the Red House Children's Book Award.  Playing with Fire, Mortal Coil and Last Stand of Dead Men each won the senior Irish Children's Book Award, in 2009, 2010 and 2013. In addition in 2010 Skulduggery Pleasant (Sceptre of the Ancients) was voted as  Irish book of the decade.

Bibliography

Skulduggery Pleasant series

First series
 Skulduggery Pleasant (April 2007); US title Sceptre of the Ancients for distinction from the series name 
 Skulduggery Pleasant: Playing With Fire (April 2008)
 Skulduggery Pleasant: The Faceless Ones (April 2009)
 Skulduggery Pleasant: Dark Days (April 2010)
 Skulduggery Pleasant: Mortal Coil (September 2010)
 Skulduggery Pleasant: Death Bringer (September 2011)
 Skulduggery Pleasant: Kingdom of the Wicked (August 2012)
 Skulduggery Pleasant: Last Stand of Dead Men (August 2013)
 Skulduggery Pleasant: The Dying of the Light (August 2014)

Second series
 Skulduggery Pleasant: Resurrection (June 2017)
 Skulduggery Pleasant: Midnight (June 2018)
 Skulduggery Pleasant: Bedlam (May 2019)
 Skulduggery Pleasant: Seasons of War (April 2020)
 Skulduggery Pleasant: Dead or Alive (April 2021)
 Skulduggery Pleasant: Until the End (April 2022)

The Demon Road Trilogy
 The Demon Road Trilogy: Demon Road (August 2015) (also titled The Demon Road Trilogy: Hell and Highway)
 The Demon Road Trilogy: Desolation (March 2016)
 The Demon Road Trilogy: American Monsters (August 2016) (also titled The Demon Road Trilogy: Infernal Finale)

Miscellaneous
 Doctor Who: "The Mystery of the Haunted Cottage" (2013), short story
 The Black Order (2019), comic series
 Marvel Comics #1000: "Deadpool Locked" (2019),
 The Falcon and the Winter Soldier (2020), tie-in comic series

References

External links

 Skulduggery Pleasant (official)
 
 

1974 births
American Kenpo practitioners
Irish children's writers
Irish fantasy writers
Irish horror writers
Irish male novelists
Irish writers of young adult literature
Living people
People educated at Drogheda Grammar School
People from Fingal
Skulduggery Pleasant books